HD 208487 is a 7th-magnitude G-type main-sequence star located approximately 144 light-years away in the constellation of Grus. It has the same spectral type as the Sun—G2V. However, it is probably slightly less massive and more luminous, indicating that it is slightly older. As of 2008, there is one known extrasolar planet confirmed to be orbiting the star.

The star HD 208487 is named Itonda. The name was selected in the NameExoWorlds campaign by Gabon, during the 100th anniversary of the IAU. Itonda, in the Myene tongue, corresponds to all that is beautiful.

Planetary system 
There is one known planet orbiting the star HD 208487, which is designated HD 208487 b. It has a mass at least half that of Jupiter and is located in an eccentric 130-day orbit.

The discovery of a second planet in the system was announced on 13 September 2005, by P.C. Gregory. The discovery was made using Bayesian analysis of the radial velocity dataset to determine the planetary parameters. However, further analysis revealed that an alternative two-planet solution for the HD 208487 system was possible, with a planet in a 28-day orbit instead of the 908-day orbit postulated, and it was concluded that activity on the star is more likely to be responsible for the residuals to the one-planet solution than the presence of a second planet.

See also 
 Lists of exoplanets

References

External links 
 

G-type main-sequence stars
Grus (constellation)
208487
108375
Planetary systems with one confirmed planet
Durchmusterung objects